Pascal Lagat (born 2 January 1960) is a French swimmer. He competed in the men's 4 × 200 metre freestyle relay at the 1980 Summer Olympics.

References

External links
 

1960 births
Living people
Olympic swimmers of France
Swimmers at the 1980 Summer Olympics
Place of birth missing (living people)
French male freestyle swimmers